Margan may refer to:
 Margan, Fars (مارگان - Mārgān)
 Margan, Sistan and Baluchestan (مارگان - Mārgān)
 Margan-e Azizabad (مرگن - Margan), West Azerbaijan Province
 Margan-e Esmail Kandi (مرگن - Margan), West Azerbaijan Province
 Margan-e Qadim (مرگن - Margan), West Azerbaijan Province
 Margan-e Vasat (مرگن - Margan), West Azerbaijan Province
 Margan (مرگن - Margan), alternate name of Maraghan, West Azerbaijan Province
 Margan Rural District (مارگان - Mārgān), in Sistan and Baluchestan Province
 Margan Top, a mountain pass in Kashmir Valley